Death is Essential is an album by the Melodic death metal band Crimson Death. It was recorded between July and September 2005. It was released in 2006 by Podre Productions.

Track listing
 Facing The End - 5:29
 Parallel World - 4:37
 Death Is Essential - 3:34
 Wall Of Prayers - 3:22
 Faintness - 6:11
 Play Of Death - 4:44
 Persecuted - 4:13
 Leave This World Behind - 4:54
 Cyanide - 5:35
 To The Stars - 3:59

Musicians
 Carlos Delgado - bass guitar
 Rafael Cubillas - drums
 Edgar Rodríguez - guitar
 Geyner Valencia - guitar, vocals, keyboards

Production information
 Written and performed by Crimson Death
 Music and lyrics by Crimson Death
 Additional keyboards by Mario Callata
 Engineered and Produced by Miguel Y Max Ascencio
 Executive production Carlos Alvarez and Podre Productions
 Cover art by Carlos Delgado
 Band photos by Percy Gutierrez
 General production by Pedro L. Alvarez

External links
Neurotoxine Digital Artworks
Death is Essential at Metalstorm.ee
Official band discography page

2006 albums
Crimson Death (band) albums